Edwin Scott Frost known professionally as E. Scott Frost, (born 1962) is a former United States magistrate judge for the Northern District of Texas and is a former nominee to be a United States district judge of the United States District Court for the Northern District of Texas.

Biography

Frost was born in 1962. Frost received a Bachelor of Business Administration degree in 1984 from Angelo State University. He received a Juris Doctor in 1987 from the Texas Tech University School of Law. He began his legal career as a law clerk to Judge Samuel Ray Cummings of the United States District Court for the Northern District of Texas, from 1987–1988. From 1988–1990, he worked as an associate for the law firm of McLean, Sanders, Price, Head & Eliss (now Brackett & Ellis, PC). From 1990–2011, he served as an Assistant United States Attorney for the Northern District of Texas. From 2011–2019, he served as a United States magistrate judge for the United States District Court for the Northern District of Texas. From 2013–2019, he served on the Operations Committee for that court.

Expired nomination to district court

On March 15, 2016, President Obama nominated Frost to serve as a United States District Judge of the United States District Court for the Northern District of Texas, to the seat vacated by Judge Samuel Ray Cummings, who took senior status on December 31, 2014. On September 7, 2016 a hearing before the Senate Judiciary Committee was held on  his nomination. His nomination expired on January 3, 2017, with the end of the 114th Congress.

References

1962 births
Living people
20th-century American lawyers
21st-century American judges
21st-century American lawyers
Angelo State University alumni
Assistant United States Attorneys
Texas lawyers
Texas Tech University School of Law alumni
United States magistrate judges